Carl Fleury (born October 22, 1973) is a Canadian retired professional ice hockey player who played 10 seasons across the ECHL and LNAH who is the current head coach of the Trois-Rivières Caron et Guay of the LNAH.

Playing career
Born  in Sainte-Claire, Quebec, Fleury spent the majority of his ECHL career as a member of the Johnstown Chiefs. Upon leaving the Chiefs in 2000, he joined St. Georges-de-Beauce Garaga, where he would play 4 seasons before leaving the team after the 2003-04 LNAH season.

Coaching career
Fleury would return to Saint Georges, Quebec to coach the Saint-Georges CRS Express, where he would lead the team to the Futura Cup. The former Saint-Georges Garaga - the team Fleury played for from 2000-2004 - were renamed the CRS Express after businessman Jean-Paul Blais bought the team in 2005. Blais is the owner of the CRS Express trucking company.

External links

1973 births
Canadian ice hockey centres
Erie Panthers players
Johnstown Chiefs players
Living people
Quebec Citadelles players
Roanoke Express players
Canadian expatriate ice hockey players in the United States